Denton Mateychuk (born July 12, 2004) is a Canadian junior ice hockey defenceman for the Moose Jaw Warriors of the Western Hockey League (WHL) and a prospect of the Columbus Blue Jackets of the National Hockey League (NHL). He was drafted twelfth overall by the Blue Jackets in the 2022 NHL Entry Draft. Mateychuk and Owen Pickering are cousins, and were both selected in the first round of the 2022 NHL Entry Draft.

Following his selection at the draft, Mateychuk was signed to a three-year, entry-level contract with the Columbus Blue Jackets on July 13, 2022.

Career statistics

Regular season and playoffs

International

References

External links

2004 births
Living people
Columbus Blue Jackets draft picks
Ice hockey people from Manitoba
National Hockey League first-round draft picks
People from Eastman Region, Manitoba
Moose Jaw Warriors players
Steinbach Pistons players
Ice hockey players at the 2020 Winter Youth Olympics